The First Vision (also called the grove experience by members of the Community of Christ) refers to a theophany which Latter Day Saints believe Joseph Smith experienced in the early 1820s, in a wooded area in Manchester, New York, called the Sacred Grove. Smith described it as a vision in which he received instruction from God the Father and Jesus Christ.

According to the account Smith told in 1838, he went to the woods to pray about which church to join but fell into the grip of an evil power that nearly overcame him. At the last moment, he was rescued by two shining "Personages" (implied to be God the Father and Jesus) who hovered above him. One of the beings told Smith not to join any of the existing churches because they all taught incorrect doctrines.

Smith wrote several accounts of the vision between 1832 and 1842, two of which were published in his lifetime. Consistency of the accounts is a subject of debate, whether variations are indicators of significant shifts in Smith's theology or are simply changing emphasis of minor details. The First Vision is revered in Latter-day Saint theology as the first step in the Latter Day Saint restoration, but it was relatively unknown to early adherents to the Latter Day Saint movement; Smith's experience was published in 1842 and canonized in 1880 but not emphasized in the Church of Jesus Christ of Latter-day Saints (LDS Church) until the early 20th century. For Latter-day Saints, the First Vision corroborates distinctive doctrines such as the bodily nature of God the Father and the uniqueness of the Restored Gospel of Jesus Christ as the only true path to exaltation.

Story of the vision
Smith wrote or dictated several versions of his vision story, and told the story to others who later published what they remember hearing. Taken together, these accounts set forth the following details:

Smith said that when he was about twelve (c. 1817–18), he became interested in religion and distressed about his sins. He studied the Bible and attended church, but the accounts differ as to whether he determined on his own that there was no existing religion built upon the true teachings of Jesus or whether the idea that all churches were false had not "entered his heart" until he experienced the vision. During this period of religious concern, he determined to turn to God in prayer. An early account says the purpose of this prayer was to ask God for mercy for his sins while later accounts emphasize his desire to know which church he should join. Smith said he went one spring morning to a secluded grove near his home to pray. He said he went to a stump in a clearing where he had left his axe the day before and began to offer his first audible prayer.

He said his prayer was interrupted by a "being from the unseen world." Smith said the being caused his tongue to swell in his mouth so that he could not speak. One account said he heard a noise behind him like someone walking towards him and then, when he tried to pray again, the noise grew louder, causing him to spring to his feet and look around, but he saw no one. In some of the accounts, he described being covered with a thick darkness and thinking that he would be destroyed. At his darkest moment, he knelt a third time to pray and, as he summoned all his power to pray, he felt ready to sink into oblivion. At that moment, he said his tongue was loosed and he saw a vision.

Smith said he saw a pillar of light brighter than the noonday sun that slowly descended on him, growing in brightness as it descended and lighting the entire area for some distance. As the light reached the tree tops, Smith feared the trees might catch fire. But when it reached the ground and enveloped him, it produced a "peculiar sensation." "[H]is mind was caught away from the natural objects with which he was surrounded; and he was enwrapped in a heavenly vision."

While experiencing the vision, he said he saw one or more "personages", described differently in Smith's accounts. In his earliest written account, Smith said he "saw the Lord." In diary entries, he said he saw a "visitation of Angels" or a "vision of angels" that included "a personage," and then "another personage" who testified that "Jesus Christ is the Son of God," as well as "many angels". In later accounts, Smith consistently said that he had seen two personages who appeared one after the other. These personages "exactly resembled each other in their features or likeness." The first personage had "light complexion, blue eyes, a piece of white cloth drawn over his shoulders, his right arm bare." In later accounts, one of the personages called Smith by name "and said, (pointing to the other), 'This is my beloved Son, hear him.'" Although Smith didn't explicitly identify the personages, most Latter Day Saints infer that they were God the Father and Jesus.

In two accounts, Smith said that the Lord told him his sins were forgiven, that he should obey the commandments, that the world was corrupt, and that the Second Coming was approaching. Later accounts say that when the personages appeared, Smith asked them "O Lord, what church shall I join?" or "Must I join the Methodist Church?" In answer, he was told that "all religious denominations were believing in incorrect doctrines, and that none of them was acknowledged of God as his church and kingdom." All churches and their professors were "corrupt", and "all their creeds were an abomination in his sight." Smith was told not to join any of the churches, but that the fullness of the gospel would be made known to him at a later time. After the vision withdrew, Smith said he came to and found himself sprawled on his back.

Context

Background

Smith was born on December 23, 1805, in Vermont, and in 1816, his family moved to a farm just outside the town of Palmyra, New York. In the first several decades of American society in the 1800s, there was a proliferation of religious options.  During the Second Great Awakening, revivals occurred in many communities in the northeastern United States. The religious environment in the region where the Smith family lived was so intense it is referred to today as the burned-over district. In the Palmyra area itself, large multi-denominational revivals occurred in 1816–17 and 1824–25.  Within eight miles of the Smith family farm, at least four Methodist, three Presbyterian, two Baptist, and several Quaker groups held regular meetings.  Despite the large number of congregations however, only about 11% of Palmyra residents belonged to any organized religion in 1820, which was in line with the national average.

Besides organized religion, the Smith family was exposed to a number of other belief systems. A large ill-defined group of early Americans have been lumped into the term "seekers".  This group held a heterogeneous set of beliefs; including that religion with creeds were unnecessary and the apostolic church no longer was on the earth. Cunning folk traditions or folk magic was also prevalent in Palmyra; intertwined and considered congruous with Christianity. Deism, the belief that God exists but does not intervene in earth, also had a growing hold in American culture with the publication of Thomas Paine's popular book The Age of Reason.

Richard Bushman has called the spiritual tradition of the Smith family "a religious melee." Like many other Americans living on the frontier at the beginning of the 19th century, Smith and his family believed in visions, dreams, and other communications with God. In 1811, Smith's maternal grandfather, Solomon Mack, described a series of visions and voices from God that resulted in his conversion to Christianity at the age of seventy-six.

Joseph Smith's mother, Lucy Mack Smith, had a "believers baptism" early in her marriage, but did not formally join to any denomination early in her marriage.  Joseph Smith Sr. was a combination of deist and seeker, who was skeptical of organized religion, but not irreligious.  Before Smith was born, Lucy went to a grove near her home in Vermont and prayed about her husband's repudiation of evangelical religion. That night she said she had a dream which she interpreted as a prophecy that Joseph Sr. would later accept the "pure and undefiled Gospel of the Son of God." She also stated that Smith Sr. had a number of dreams or visions between 1811 and 1819, the first of which occurring when his mind was "much excited upon the subject of religion." The first of Joseph Sr.'s visions confirmed to him the correctness of his refusal to join any organized religious group.  The Smith's father additionally joined the local masonic lodge, with Smith's older brother Hyrum sometime shortly after arriving in Palmyra.

Smith's older brother Alvin did not join any organized religion.  Lucy said that after Alvin died in late 1823, she sought comfort in religion, and formally joined the Presbyterian church in either 1824 or 1825 along with her children Hyrum, Samuel and Sophronia.

Dating the First Vision

Smith never gave a specific date of his reported vision, but said it occurred in the early 1820s, when he was in his early teens.  In the 1832 account Smith says that from age twelve to fifteen he was pondering the situation of the world in his heart, placing the vision in 1821.  Smith's scribe Frederick G. Williams inserted into the 1832 account that it had occurred "in the 16th year of [his] age" or 1821. In the 1838 account, Smith said the vision took place "early in the spring of eighteen hundred and twenty."  In both his 1835 and 1842 account, Smith wrote that it occurred when "about fourteen years of age."

Historians have looked at contextual clues from the accounts to further narrow down the date. In the 1838 account Smith noted the following events:

 "Sometime in the second year after our removal to Manchester, there was in the place where we lived an unusual excitement on the subject of religion"
 "(The unusual excitement) commenced with the Methodist"
 "(The unusual excitement) soon became general among all the sects in that region of country, ... and great multitudes united themselves to the different religious parties, which created no small stir and division among the people"
 "My Fathers family was proselyted to the Presbyterian faith and four of them joined that Church, Namely, My Mother Lucy, My Brothers Hyrum, Samuel Harrison, and my Sister Sophronia."
 "It was on the morning of a beautiful clear day early in the spring"

Each of these details have been the subject of significant research and debated widely among historians, critics, apologists and polemicists, sparking a variety of historical and theological interpretations. In the fall of 1967 the Reverend Wesley P. Walters published a pamphlet asserting that the "unusual excitement" Joseph Smith wrote of matched the Palmyra revival of 1824, and was anachronistic to the 1820 setting.  Walters' pamphlet created a stir, and provoked a strong response from scholars at Brigham Young University (BYU).  By spring of 1968 BYU Professor Truman G. Madsen organized around three dozen scholars to respond to Walters, and wrote to the First Presidency of the LDS Church that the "first vision has come under severe historical attack."  Walters's thesis and the subsequent response has framed the historical debate.

Dating the move to Manchester
Local moves of the Smith family have been used in attempts to identify the date of the vision. Smith wrote that the First Vision occurred in "the second year after our removal to Manchester." The evidence for the date of this move has been interpreted by many believers as supporting 1820 and by non-believers as supporting 1824. Manchester land assessment records show an increase in assessed value of the Smith property in 1823. Because the tax assessment of the Smiths' Manchester land rose in 1823, critics argue that the Smiths completed their Manchester cabin in 1822, which suggests an approximate date of 1824 for the First Vision. Joseph Smith Sr. was first taxed for Manchester land in 1820. In 1821 and 1822, the land was valued at $700, but in 1823, the property was assessed at $1000, which may indicate "that the Smiths had completed construction of their cabin and cleared a significant portion of their land". In response, some Mormon apologists argue that in 1818, the Smiths mistakenly constructed a cabin 59 feet north of the actual property line (which would have been in Palmyra rather than Manchester) and the 1823 increase in the property assessment was related to the completion of a wood frame home on the Manchester side of the Palmyra–Manchester township line. The latter interpretation would lend support for dating the First Vision to 1820.

Dating the revival

Richard Bushman wrote that Smith "began to be concerned about religion in late 1817 or early 1818, when the aftereffects of the revival of 1816 and 1817 were still being felt." Milton V. Backman wrote that religious outbreaks occurred in 1819–20 within a fifty-mile radius of Smith's home: "Church records, newspapers, religious journals, and other contemporary sources clearly reveal that great awakenings occurred in more than fifty western New York towns or villages during the revival of 1819–1820 .... Primary sources also specify that great multitudes joined the Methodist, Presbyterian, and Calvinist Baptist societies in the region of country where Joseph Smith lived." Richard Lloyd Anderson has pointed out that there was a Methodist Camp Meeting in Palmyra in 1818, with about 400 in attendance, that is verified by a contemporary journal. This agrees with the three-year time frame of his pondering on religion mentioned in Smith's 1832 account.  Backman cited evidence of a Methodist Camp Meeting in Palmyra in June 1820.

Dating the Smith family conversions to Presbyterianism
In the 1838 version of the First Vision (first published in 1842) that has been canonized by the LDS Church, his family's decision to join the Presbyterian Church occurs in the same year as his First Vision.

The draft copy of Lucy Mack Smith's history does not mention the first vision at all. However, the fair copy, penned by the same scribe as the draft copy, and which was in the possession of Lucy and on which she registered a copyright, includes in the narrative a copy of the 1838 version of the first vision, beginning with Joseph's words "I was at this time in my fifteenth year." After the first vision account, Lucy continues with "From this time until the 21st of Sep. 1823, Joseph continued as usual to labor with his father; and nothing during this interval  of very great importance..." At this point Lucy describes the visitations of Moroni and the promise of the golden plates, followed by the death of Alvin, in November 1823.

Lucy then states that she and some of her children sought comfort in the religious revival after Alvin's death. This statement has been taken to refer to her and three of the children (Hyrum, Samuel, and Sophronia) joining the Presbyterian church. If so, and if Joseph's statement that they joined this church in the same year as his first vision is accurate, then the first vision would have taken place in 1824. However, this conclusion requires ignoring both Joseph's statement that the first vision occurred during his fifteenth year and Lucy's chronology in the fair copy. Alternatively, D. Michael Quinn says that Joseph Smith's account is a conflation of events over several years, a typical biographical device for streamlining the narrative.

Dating the "beautiful, clear day"
In the 1838 account Smith said that this vision occurred "on the morning of a beautiful, clear day, early in the spring of eighteen hundred and twenty." Two Latter-day Saints, researching weather reports and maple sugar production records, argue in a non-peer-reviewed magazine article that the most likely exact date for the First Vision was Palm Sunday, March 26, 1820. Mark Staker, an expert on the sacred grove site, states that early spring would be "sometime in most likely March, April, or the beginning weeks of May."

Recorded accounts of the vision

The importance of the First Vision within the Latter Day Saint movement evolved over time. There is little evidence that Smith discussed the First Vision publicly prior to 1830. Mormon historian James B. Allen notes that:

 The fact that none of the available contemporary writings about Joseph Smith in the 1830s, none of the publications of the Church in that decade, and no contemporary journal or correspondence yet discovered mentions the story of the first vision is convincing evidence that at best it received only limited circulation in those early days.

1830s reference to early Christian regeneration

In June 1830, Smith provided the first clear record of a significant personal religious experience prior to the visit of the angel Moroni. At that time, Smith and his associate Oliver Cowdery were establishing the Church of Christ, the first Latter Day Saint church.  In the "Articles and Covenants of the Church of Christ," Smith recounted his early history, noting

"For, after that it truly was manifested unto [Smith] that he had received remission of his sins, he was entangled again in the vanities of the world, but after truly repenting, God visited him by an holy angel ... and gave unto him power, by the means which was before prepared that he should translate a book."

No further explanation of this "manifestation" is provided. Although the reference was later linked to the First Vision, its original hearers would have understood the manifestation as simply another of many revival experiences in which the subject testified that his sins had been forgiven.

1832 Smith account
The earliest extant account of the First Vision was handwritten by Smith in 1832 in a letter book, but its existence was not known outside the Church History department until it was published in 1965.  Sometime around 1930, the pages on which the account was written were torn from the letter book, removed from the Church Historian's collection and placed into a private safe in the custody of Apostle Joseph Fielding Smith.  In 1952, General Authority Levi E. Young met with amateur historian LaMar Peterson and told him of a "strange account" in Joseph's handwriting that did not mention God the Father.  In 1964, Peterson told Jerald and Sandra Tanner about the account, and they subsequently asked permission from Joseph Fielding Smith to see it, but were denied.  In 1964, Smith authorized the showing of the account to Paul R. Cheesman, a BYU student working on his master's thesis.  The Tanners obtained a copy of the thesis transcript and the account was published for the first time in 1965.

[T]he Lord heard my cry in the wilderness and while in <the> attitude of calling upon the Lord <in the 16th year of my age> a pillar of fire light above the brightness of the sun at noon day come down from above and rested upon me and I was filled with the spirit of god and the <Lord> opened the heavens upon me and I saw the Lord and he spake unto me saying Joseph <my son> thy sins are forgiven thee. go thy <way> walk in my statutes and keep my commandments behold I am the Lord of glory I was crucifyed for the world that all those who believe on my name may have Eternal life <behold> the world lieth in sin and at this time and none doeth good no not one they have turned aside from the gospel and keep not <my> commandments they draw near to me with their lips while their hearts are far from me and mine anger is kindling against the inhabitants of the earth to visit them according to th[e]ir ungodliness and to bring to pass that which <hath> been spoken by the mouth of the prophets and Ap[o]stles behold and lo I come quickly as it [is] written of me in the cloud <clothed> in the glory of my Father ...."

Unlike Smith's later accounts of the vision, the 1832 account emphasizes personal forgiveness and mentions neither an appearance of God the Father nor the phrase "This is my beloved Son, hear him." In the 1832 account, Smith also stated that before he experienced the First Vision, his own searching of the scriptures had led him to the conclusion that mankind had "apostatized from the true and living faith and there was no society or denomination that built upon the Gospel of Jesus Christ as recorded in the new testament."

1834 Cowdery account
In several issues of the Mormon periodical Messenger and Advocate (1834–35), Oliver Cowdery wrote an early biography of Smith. In one issue, Cowdery explained that Smith was confused by the different religions and local revivals during his "15th year" (1820), leading him to wonder which church was true. In the next issue of the biography, Cowdery explained that reference to Smith's "15th year" was a typographical error, and that actually the revivals and religious confusion took place in Smith's "17th year."

Therefore, according to Cowdery, the religious confusion led Smith to pray in his bedroom, late on the night of September 23, 1823, after the others had gone to sleep, to know which of the competing denominations was correct and whether "a Supreme being did exist." In response, an angel appeared and granted him forgiveness of his sins. The remainder of the story roughly parallels Smith's later description of a visit by an angel in 1823 who told him about the golden plates. Thus, Cowdery's account, containing a single vision, differs from Smith's 1832 account, which contains two separate visions, one in 1821 prompted by religious confusion (the First Vision) and a separate one regarding the plates on September 22, 1822. Cowdery's account also differs from Smith's 1842 account, which includes a First Vision in 1820 and a second vision on September 22, 1823.

1835 Smith accounts
On November 9, 1835, Smith dictated an account of the First Vision in his diary after telling it to a stranger who had visited his home earlier that day. Smith said that when perplexed about religions matters, he had gone to a grove to pray but that his tongue seemed swollen in his mouth and that he had been interrupted twice by the sound of someone walking behind him. Finally, as he prayed, he said his tongue was loosed, and he saw a pillar of fire in which an unidentified "personage" appeared. Then another unidentified personage told Smith his sins were forgiven and "testified unto [Smith] that Jesus Christ is the Son of God." An interlineation in the text notes, "and I saw many angels in this vision." Smith said this vision occurred when he was 14 years old and that when he was 17, he "saw another vision of angels in the night season after I had retired to bed" (referring to the later visit of the angel Moroni who showed him the location of the golden plates). Smith identified none of these personages or angels with "the Lord" as he had in 1832.

A few days later, on November 14, 1835, Smith told the story to another visitor, Erastus Holmes. In his journal, Smith said that he had recited his life story "up to the time I received the first visitation of angels, which was when I was about fourteen years old."

1838 Smith account

In 1838, Smith began dictating a history, introduced as "I have been induced to write this history ... in relation both to myself and the Church." This history included a new account of the First Vision, later published in three issues of Times and Seasons. This version was later incorporated into the Pearl of Great Price, which was canonized by the LDS Church in 1880, as Joseph Smith–History. Thus, it is often called the "canonized version" of the First Vision story.

This version differs from the 1840 version because it includes the proclamation, "This is My Beloved Son, hear Him" from one of the personages, whereas the 1840 version does not. The canonized version says that in the spring of 1820, during a period of "confusion and strife among the different denominations" following an "unusual excitement on the subject of religion", Smith had debated which of the various Christian groups he should join. While in turmoil, he read from the Epistle of James: "If any of you lack wisdom, let him ask of God, that giveth to all men liberally, and upbraideth not; and it shall be given him."

One morning, deeply impressed by this scripture, the fourteen-year-old Smith went to the woods near his home, knelt, and began his first vocal prayer. Almost immediately he was confronted by an evil power that prevented speech. A darkness gathered around him, and Smith believed that he would be destroyed. He continued the prayer silently, asking for God's assistance though still resigned to destruction. At this moment a light brighter than the sun descended towards him, and he was delivered from the evil power.

In the light, Smith "saw two personages standing in the air". One pointed to the other and said, "This is My Beloved Son, hear Him." Smith asked which religious sect he should join and was told to join none of them because all existing religions had corrupted the teachings of Jesus Christ.

In his 1838 account, Smith wrote that he made an oblique reference to the vision to his mother in 1820, telling her the day it happened that he had "learned for [him]self that Presbyterianism is not true." Lucy did not mention this conversation in her memoirs in her own words, but included the narrative from Joseph's 1838 account directly.

Smith wrote he "could find none that would believe" his experience. He said that shortly after the experience, he told the story of his revelation to a Methodist minister who responded "with great contempt, saying it was all of the devil, that there was no such thing as visions or revelations in these days; that all such things had ceased with the apostles, and that there never would be any more of them." He also said that the telling of his vision story "excited a great deal of prejudice against me among professors of religion, and was the cause of great persecution, which continued to increase." There is no extant evidence from the 1830s for this persecution beyond Smith's own testimony. None of the earliest anti-Mormon literature mentioned the First Vision. Smith also said he told others about the vision during the 1820s, and some family members said that they had heard him mention it, but none prior to 1823, when Smith said he had his second vision. Joseph's mother recorded the 1820-23 persecution of Joseph in her memoir, stating "From this time until the 21st of Sep. 1823, Joseph continued as usual to labor with his father; and nothing during this interval occurred of very great importance; though he suffered, as one would naturally suppose every kind of opposition and persecution from the different orders of religion."

1840 Pratt account
In September 1840, Orson Pratt published a version of the First Vision in England.  This version states that after Smith saw the light, "his mind was caught away, from the natural objects with which he was surrounded; and he was enwrapped in a heavenly vision." Pratt's account referred to "two glorious personages who exactly resembled each other in their features or likeness".

1842 Wentworth Letter
In 1842, two years before his death, Smith wrote to John Wentworth, editor of the Chicago Democrat, outlining the basic beliefs of his church and including an account of the First Vision. Smith said that he had been "about fourteen years of age" when he had received the First Vision. Like the Pratt account, Smith's Wentworth letter said that his "mind was taken away from the objects with which I was surrounded, and I was enwrapped in a heavenly vision." and had seen "two glorious personages who exactly resembled each other in features, and likeness, surrounded with a brilliant light which eclipsed the sun at noon-day." Smith said he was told that no religious denomination "was acknowledged of God as his church and kingdom" and that he was "expressly commanded to 'go not after them.'"

Smith's accounts found in later reminiscences
In the rough draft of her autobiography, Smith's mother, Lucy Mack Smith, describes her son being visited in 1823 by an angel, who told him "...there is not a true church on the Earth," but does not include a First Vision narrative. The fair copy of the autobiography, prepared under Lucy's direction by the scribe who had also penned the rough draft, includes in the narrative a copy of the 1838 version of the First Vision from Times and Seasons.

Late in his life, Smith's brother William gave two accounts of the First Vision, dating it to 1823, when William was twelve years old. William said the religious excitement in Palmyra had occurred in 1822–23 (rather than the actual date of 1824–25); that it was stimulated by the preaching of a Methodist, the Rev. George Lane, a "great revival preacher"; and that his mother and some of his siblings had then joined the Presbyterian church.

William Smith said he based his account on what Joseph had told William and the rest of his family the day after the First Vision:

[A] light appeared in the heavens, and descended until it rested upon the trees where he was. It appeared like fire. But to his great astonishment, did not burn the trees. An angel then appeared to him and conversed with him upon many things. He told him that none of the sects were right; but that if he was faithful in keeping the commandments he should receive, the true way should be made known to him; that his sins were forgiven, etc.

In an 1884 account, William also stated that when Joseph first saw the light above the trees in the grove, he fell unconscious for an undetermined amount of time, after which he awoke and heard "the personage whom he saw" speak to him.

Comparison of written accounts

In the first written accounts of the First Vision, the central theme is personal forgiveness, while in later accounts the focus shifts to the apostasy and corruption of churches. In early accounts, Smith seems reluctant to talk about the vision; in later versions, various details are mentioned that were not mentioned in the earliest narratives.

Jerald and Sandra Tanner cite the multiple versions of the First Vision as evidence that it may have been fabricated by Smith. For instance, they have specifically pointed out that it is unclear between various versions whether Smith was 14 or 15 at the time of the vision; whether he attended a contemporaneous religious revival; whether the supernatural personages told Smith that his sins were forgiven; whether the personages were angels, Jesus, God, or some combination; and whether Smith had already determined for himself that all churches were false before he experienced the vision. However, Stephen Prothero argues that any historian should expect to find differences in narratives written many years apart, and that the key elements are present in all the accounts.

Some believers view differences in the accounts as overstated. Richard L. Anderson wrote, "What are the main problems of interpreting so many accounts? The first problem is the interpreter. One person perceives harmony and interconnections while another overstates differences." Other believers view the differences in the accounts as reflective of Smith's increase in maturity and knowledge over time.

The following table compares elements of First Vision accounts:

Accounts of others:

Interpretations and responses to the vision
Smith said that he was persecuted by local "professors of religion" after sharing his story. Historian D. Michael Quinn noted that at the time, the Smith family practiced various Cunning Folk traditions that were criticized by leaders of organized religion, and that Smith's vision may have given Smith confidence to ignore those leaders and continue being an active participant in the Cunning Folk culture.

Among contemporary denominations of the Latter Day Saint movement, the First Vision is typically viewed as a significant (often the most significant) event in the latter day restoration of the Church of Christ. However, the faiths differ in their teachings about the vision's precise meaning and details. Secular scholars and non-Mormons view the vision as a deliberate deception, false memory, delusion, or hallucination, or some combination of these.

The Godhead in Latter Day Saint theology

The first vision is often used to illustrate various LDS doctrines about the attributes of God and the nature of the Godhead.  The LDS Church teaches that the vision shows that the members of the Godhead are three separate beings.

In academia it is assumed that differences Smith's first vision accounts reflect an evolving concept of the Godhead. For example, references to God in the early writings by Smith, including the Book of Mormon, can be seen as more Trinitarian or modalistic, where God is a single entity, but manifests himself in different modes, sometimes as the Father, sometimes as the Son, but always as an expression of the same one God.  Modalism was common in upstate New York at the time, so the appearance of a single personage (Jesus) in Smith's 1832 account would be consistent with prevailing modalistic thought.

Smith's early revelations and writings frequently referred to the Father and the Son being one, but after May 1833, he never again referred to God the Father and Jesus as being one.  In 1835, the Lectures on Faith were published as part of the Doctrine and Covenants, teaching a form of Binitarianism where the Father is a "personage of the spirit" and the Son is a "personage of tabernacle" looking exactly the same in appearance, with the Holy Ghost being the shared mind between them.  Joseph Smith's later accounts of the First Vision reflects the theology of the Lectures on Faith, for example, the 1835 account notes that "a personage appeared in the midst of this pillar of flame, ... Another personage soon appeared, like unto the first."  By the 1840s Smith was teaching a form of social trinitarianism—that members of the Godhead were separate and distinct individuals united in purpose.

LDS Church scholars generally do not accept the view that the early Latter Day Saints were modalists or binitarian.  Smith himself also rejected criticism that his views of God had changed, saying "I have always declared God to be a distinct personage, Jesus Christ a separate and distinct personage from God the Father, and that the Holy Ghost was a distinct personage and a Spirit: and these three constitute three distinct personages and three Gods."

Early awareness by Latter Day Saints
The importance of the First Vision within the Latter Day Saint movement evolved over time. Early adherents were unaware of the details of the vision until 1840, when the earliest accounts were published in Great Britain. An account of the First Vision was not published in the United States until 1842, shortly before Smith's death. Jan Shipps has written that the vision was "practically unknown" until an account of it was published in 1842. LDS historian Richard Bushman wrote, "At first, Joseph was reluctant to talk about his vision. Most early converts probably never heard about the 1820 vision."

Interpretation and use by the LDS Church
According to the LDS Church, the vision teaches that God the Father and Jesus Christ are separate beings with glorified bodies of flesh and bone; that mankind was literally created in the image of God; that Satan is real but God infinitely greater; that God hears and answers prayer; that no other contemporary church had the fullness of Christ's gospel; and that revelation has not ceased. In the 21st century, the vision features prominently in the Church's program of proselytism.

An official website of the LDS Church calls the First Vision "the greatest event in world history since the birth, ministry, and resurrection of Jesus Christ." In 1998, church president Gordon B. Hinckley declared,
Our entire case as members of The Church of Jesus Christ of Latter-day Saints rests on the validity of this glorious First Vision. It was the parting of the curtain to open this, the dispensation of the fullness of times. Nothing on which we base our doctrine, nothing we teach, nothing we live by is of greater importance than this initial declaration. I submit that if Joseph Smith talked with God the Father and His Beloved Son, then all else of which he spoke is true. This is the hinge on which turns the gate that leads to the path of salvation and eternal life. In 1961, Hinckley had gone further: "Either Joseph Smith talked with the Father and the Son or he did not. If he did not, we are engaged in a blasphemy." Likewise, in a January 2007 interview conducted for the PBS documentary The Mormons, Hinckley said of the First Vision, "it's either true or false. If it's false, we're engaged in a great fraud. If it's true, it's the most important thing in the world .... That's our claim. That's where we stand, and that's where we fall, if we fall. But we don't. We just stand secure in that faith."

A 2012 Pew Research survey of self-identified members of the LDS Church asked how important believing that Joseph Smith saw God the Father and Jesus Christ was to being a "good Mormon." 80% responded that it was essential, 13% responded that it was important but not essential, and 6% responded that it was either not too, or not at all essential.

Historical usage

The canonical First Vision story was not emphasized in the sermons of Smith's immediate successors, Brigham Young and John Taylor, within the LDS Church. Hugh Nibley noted that although a "favorite theme of Brigham Young's was the tangible, personal nature of God," he "never illustrates [the theme] by any mention of the first vision." This is not to say that Young did not teach about the First Vision, since he clearly did on multiple occasions.

Taylor gave a complete account of the First Vision story in an 1850 letter written as he began missionary work in France, and he may have alluded to it in a discourse given in 1859. Throughout the late 1870s and 1880s, Taylor made multiple, explicit references to the First Vision in his sermons, books and letters. These included his 1886 letter to his family, one of his last major theological pronouncements in which he stated "God revealed Himself, as also the Lord Jesus Christ, unto his servant the Prophet Joseph Smith".

Three non-Mormon students of Mormonism, Douglas Davies, Kurt Widmer, and Jan Shipps, agree that the church's emphasis on the First Vision was a "'late development', only gaining an influential status in LDS reflection late in the nineteenth century."  The first important visual representation of the First Vision was painted by the Danish convert C. C. A. Christensen sometime between 1869 and 1878; George Manwaring, inspired by the artist, wrote a hymn about the First Vision ("Oh, How Lovely Was the Morning", later renamed "Joseph Smith's First Prayer"), first published in 1884.

Widmer states that it was primarily through "the post 1883 sermons of Latter-day Saint Apostle George Q. Cannon that the modern interpretation and significance of the First Vision in Mormonism began to take shape." As the sympathetic but non-Mormon historian Jan Shipps has written, "When the first generation of leadership died off, leaving the community to be guided mainly by men who had not known Joseph, the First Vision emerged as a symbol that could keep the slain Mormon leader at center stage." The centennial anniversary of the vision in 1920 "was a far cry from the almost total lack of reference to it just fifty years before." By 1939, even George D. Pyper, the Church's Sunday School superintendent and manager of the Mormon Tabernacle Choir, found it "surprising that none of the first song writers wrote intimately of the first vision."

Church president Joseph F. Smith helped raise the First Vision to its modern status as a pillar of church theology. Largely through Joseph F. Smith's influence, Smith's 1838 account of the First Vision became part of the canon of the church in 1880 when the faith canonized Smith's early history as part of the Pearl of Great Price. After plural marriage ended at the turn of the 20th century, Joseph F. Smith heavily promoted the First Vision, and it soon replaced polygamy in the minds of adherents as the main defining element of Mormonism and the source of the faith's perception of persecution by outsiders. From 1905 to 1912, the story of the First Vision began to be incorporated into church histories, missionary tracts, and Sunday school lesson manuals.  As a result, belief in the First Vision is now considered fundamental to the faith, second in importance only to belief in the divinity of Jesus.

In 1920, the LDS Church held a commemoration in the Sacred Grove to celebrate the 100th anniversary of the First Vision. At the 200th anniversary in 2020, a video recording of church president Russell M. Nelson reading "The Restoration of the Fulness of the Gospel of Jesus Christ: A Bicentennial Proclamation to the World" in the grove was released at the church's general conference.

Perspectives within the Community of Christ
The Community of Christ generally refers to the First Vision as the "grove experience" and takes a flexible view about its historicity, emphasizing "the healing presence of God and the forgiving mercy of Christ" felt by Joseph Smith.  The modern church is Trinitarian, and in contrast to the LDS Church, does not use the First Vision as evidence for the Godhead being three separate beings.

William Smith, a younger brother of Smith, and a key figure in the early Reorganized Church of Jesus Christ of Latter Day Saints (RLDS Church, renamed the Community of Christ in 2001) gave several accounts of the First Vision, although in 1883 he stated that a "more elaborate and accurate description of his vision" was to be found in Smith's own history.

The RLDS Church did not emphasize the First Vision during the 19th century. In the early-20th century, there was a revival of interest, and during most of the century, the First Vision was viewed as an essential element of the Restoration. In many cases, it was taught as the foundation and even the embodiment of the Restoration. The vision was also interpreted as a justification for the exclusive authority of the RLDS Church as the Church of Christ.

In the mid- to late-20th century, writers within the RLDS Church emphasized the First Vision as an illustration of the centrality of Jesus. The church began taking a broader view of the vision, and used it as an example of how God evolves the church over time through revelation and restoration. There was less emphasis on the Great Apostasy and a growing belief that the First Vision itself was not necessarily identical with Smith's later reconstructions and interpretations of the vision, what one RLDS Church Historian has called "genuine historical sophistication." In 1980, this Church Historian noted that he had "systematically brought to the attention" of hundreds of church members "the substantive differences in half a dozen accounts of the First Vision" and expressed his satisfaction that RLDS scholars, "deeply moved and augmented by the presence of the wondrously diverse and conflicting accounts of the First Vision," could "begin the exciting work of developing a mythology of Latter Day Saint beginnings."

View of The Church of Jesus Christ (Bickertonite)
The Church of Jesus Christ (Bickertonite), a Rigdonite branch with 15,000 members headquartered in Pennsylvania, has had an independent history since the 1844 succession crisis. The church refers to the vision obliquely in a lengthy excerpt from Smith's 1842 account included in its official literature, in which the date "1820" and "a personage" (singular, not plural) are mentioned in paraphrases.

Church of Christ (Temple Lot)
The Church of Christ (Temple Lot), a branch with 7000 adherents, rejects many of Smith's post-1832 revelations. Nevertheless, the church uses several elements of the 1842 account of the First Vision, including Smith's desire to know which church he should join, his reading of James 1:5, his prayer in the grove, the appearance of God the Father and Jesus Christ, the statement by Jesus that all existing churches were corrupt, and the instruction that Smith should join none of them.

Criticism and response
Writing of the "unusual excitement on the subject of religion" described in the First Vision story canonized by the LDS Church, Milton V. Backman said that although "the tools of the historian" could neither verify nor challenge the First Vision, "records of the past can be examined to determine the reliability of Joseph's description regarding the historical setting." Grant Palmer and other critics claim that there are serious discrepancies between the various accounts, as well as anachronisms revealed by lack of contemporary corroboration. Other critics, like Fawn Brodie and Jerald and Sandra Tanner argue that the Smith's accounts are not unique and not much different from similar visions and accounts being reported by others, such as Elias Smith and Asa Wild, around the same time.

Leaders of the LDS Church have acknowledged that the First Vision as well as the Book of Mormon and Smith himself constitute "stumbling blocks for many." Apostle Neal A. Maxwell wrote:
In our own time, Joseph Smith, the First Vision, and the Book of Mormon constitute stumbling blocks for many—around which they cannot get—unless they are meek enough to examine all the evidence at hand, not being exclusionary as a result of accumulated attitudes in a secular society. Humbleness of mind is the initiator of expansiveness of mind.

In a 2007 PBS documentary, Richard Mouw, an evangelical theologian and student of Mormonism, summarized his feelings about the First Vision:
My instinct is to attribute a sincerity to Joseph Smith. And yet at the same time, as an evangelical Christian, I do not believe that the members of the godhead really appeared to him and told him that he should start on a mission of, among other things, denouncing the kinds of things that I believe as a Presbyterian. I can't believe that. And yet at the same time, I really don't believe that he was simply making up a story that he knew to be false in order to manipulate people and to gain power over a religious movement. And so I live with the mystery.

Side-by-side comparison of Joseph Smith vision accounts

Notes

References

.
.
.
.
.
.
.
.
.
.
.
.
.
.
.

.
.
.
.
.
.
.
.
.
.
.
.
.
.
.
.
.
.

. See also: History of the Church of Jesus Christ of Latter-day Saints
.
.
.
.
.
.

.
. See also: Biographical Sketches of Joseph Smith the Prophet, and His Progenitors for Many Generations

.
.
.
.
.
.
.
.
.
.
.
.
.

Further reading
.
.
.
.
.
.

External links

 The canonized version, from ChurchofJesusChrist.org.

1820 in Christianity
1820 in New York (state)
Angelic apparitions
Christophany
History of the Latter Day Saint movement
Joseph Smith
Latter Day Saint doctrines regarding deity
Latter Day Saint movement in New York (state)
Latter Day Saint terms
Mormonism-related controversies
Theophany
Visions (spirituality)